Vasilisa Melentyeva (died 1579) was the legendary sixth wife of Ivan the Terrible. The marriage (not authorized by the Church) may have been celebrated in 1575 or she was simply a concubine. Modern scholars now tend to consider her to be a 19th-century fraud.

Life
According to the legend, before her marriage to Ivan, Vasilisa is on record to have been a widow of a dyak, Melentiy Ivanov, serving in the Livonian War. Though the Tsar considered her beautiful and sweet natured, a few months after their marriage, he discovered her having an affair with a prince named Devletev. Ivan forced Vasilisa to watch her lover be impaled, and as further punishment, confined her to life in a cloister.

Of all the eight wives of Ivan the Terrible, only Maria Dolgorukaya (who is also considered a 19th-century fraud) and Vasilisa Melentyeva do not have graves or any mentions in official court documents.

There is apparently no evidence of her existence in the early modern sources except two minor mentions: the first, cited by Nikolay Karamzin, simply listed her name "as concubine" with Ivan's other spouses. The more extensive second mention, is believed to be the work of  Alexander Sulakadzev, a notorious forger of the early 19th century.

However it is claimed that researchers have more recently found documents confirming her special relationship with the tsar.

Alexander Ostrovsky wrote a play about her in 1867: "Василиса Мелентьева".

References

Sources
 Troyat, Henri Ivan le Terrible. Flammarion, Paris, 1982
 de Madariaga, Isabel Ivan the Terrible. Giulio Einaudi editore, 2005

|-

|-

1579 deaths
Concubines
People whose existence is disputed
Wives of Ivan the Terrible
Year of birth unknown